Keller High School is a public high school located in the city of Keller, Texas and is served by the Keller Independent School District. The school educates students in the majority of the city of Keller, western Southlake, northwestern Colleyville, northern North Richland Hills, and most of Westlake, including the Vaquero development. It has been recognized as a National Blue Ribbon School for the 1999-2000 school year. As of 2011, Keller High School is rated "recognized" by the Texas Education Agency and is part of one of the largest districts in Texas to have an overall recognized rating. Per the 2017 US News Best High Schools System official numbers, 2,645 students attended the school.

History
The current Keller High located on 500 Pate Orr Road was constructed in 1984 and was opened in 1985. Prior to this the current Keller Middle School located on 300 College Avenue was the Keller High School. Built in 1934, the Keller ISD Education Center was the original location of the Keller Elementary, Middle and High School and is first high school to be built in KISD, followed by Fossil Ridge High School, Central High School and finally Timber Creek High School as of 2009. The school's mascot is the 'Keller Indians' & motto is the 'Home of the Indians'. The school colors are navy and Vegas gold. Keller, Central, Fossil Ridge, and Timber Creek all share the same stadium and natatorium.

JROTC
Keller High School currently has a JROTC program. The Junior Reserve Officer Training Corps (JROTC) is a federal program sponsored by the United States Armed Forces in high schools and also in some middle schools across the United States and United States military bases across the world. However, the program takes place at Central High School, a neighboring school in the KISD. The program, which consists of participants from all 4 KISD high schools, has won numerous awards and recognition.

Athletics
Keller High School has won numerous University Interscholastic League (UIL) State Championships in the following sports:

Basketball
In 2017, Keller Boys' Varsity Basketball Team went to the state championship in San Antonio, Texas but lost to Karen Wagner High School in the semifinals at the Alamodome with a crowd of more than 12,000 spectators at the game. TCU-bound R.J. Nembhard led the team that year. He was a 4-star recruit and was 11th ranked in the state of Texas basketball recruiting. He averaged 28 points per game in his senior year and led the team in assists as well.

Softball
Keller High Softball has won 4 state championships in the 5A & 6A classes of Texas UIL. Their championships occurred in 2003, 2005, 2016, and 2017. The 2003 & 2005 State Champion teams were coached by Moe Fritz. The 2016 & 2017 State Champion teams were coached by Bryan Poehler. As of 2017, Keller High school has graduated 63 players who have gone on to play softball in college. The softball team is annually one of the most dominant softball teams in Texas.

Keller High School Band
The Keller High School Band has received numerous awards over the years. The band placed 2nd at the 1999 Texas 4A State Marching Band Contest, and was the 1999 TMEA 4A Honor Band.  They have been honored five times by the Foundation for Music Education as a National Winner in the National Wind Band Honors Project.

The marching band was awarded the 2015 Sudler Shield of Honor by the John Philip Sousa Foundation, making them one of only 76 band programs worldwide to hold this honor.

In 2018, the Keller High School Marching Band represented the entire state of Texas at the annual Macy's Thanksgiving Day Parade in New York City.

Keller High School Choir
The Keller High School Choir consists of five concert ensembles and one show choir. In 2014, the Keller Chanteurs Varsity Treble Choir became the first choral ensemble from Keller ISD to perform at the TMEA Convention. In 2017, the Keller Chanteurs Varsity Treble Choir became the first ensemble from Keller ISD to perform at the National ACDA Conference. The Keller "Tribe" Show Choir has won numerous awards which include being a 4 time grand champion of the Lone Star Show Choir Invitational.

Mascot
The school's mascot, the Keller Indians, has been criticized as demeaning to indigenous people of the Americas by students of the school. An online petition by students to lobby change of the mascot reached 35,000 signatures, following an earlier petition by the Texan non-profit Society of Native Nations. An opposition position garnered 3000 signatures, with a trustee comparing the students' aims to Nazi actions in the Holocaust.

Notable alumni
Alumni
Bryce Boneau, soccer player
Giovanni Capriglione, politician
Hugh Charles, professional Canadian football player
Jon Edwards, professional baseball player
Nolan Frese, professional football player
Jim Landtroop, politician and businessman
Max Muncy, professional baseball player
Bubba Thornton, college track and field coach
Davis Webb, NFL quarterback
RJ Nembhard, professional basketball player
Cole Male, Musician
Kyle Morris, Musician
Faculty 
Christopher M. Anderson, former band director

References

External links
 Keller Independent School District Website

High schools in Tarrant County, Texas
Public high schools in Texas